In the Eyes of the Lord is 100 Demons' first album. Produced by Chris "Zeuss" Harris and released under the label Good Life Recordings. Drawing inspiration from Japanese aesthetics and Agnostic beliefs, In The Eyes of the Lord is a metalcore album with punk rock influence on the drum and vocal sections. This album compared to its successor; 100 Demons (album) is more of a raw punk album than what the band would have had eventually evolved into. 

Some re-releases of In the Eyes of the Lord contain bonus tracks, with various demos and unreleased tracks. The re-releases are also remastered versions of the original 2000 release. Titles of tracks include Straight to Hell and Cast in Blood .

Track listing

2000 debut albums
100 Demons albums
Albums produced by Chris "Zeuss" Harris
Good Life Recordings albums